Louis M. Mohs (January 18, 1896 – August 13, 1967) was an American football player.  A native of St. Cloud, Minnesota, he played college football for St. Thomas and professional football in the National Football League (NFL) as an end, guard and tackle for the Minneapolis Marines. He appeared in 15 NFL games, 13 as a starter, from 1922 to 1924.

References

1896 births
1967 deaths
Players of American football from Minnesota
Minneapolis Marines players
People from St. Cloud, Minnesota
St. Thomas (Minnesota) Tommies football players